Boy Crazy is an out-of-print card game created by Decipher, Inc. during the Pokémon Trading Card Game boom. Each card featured a picture of a boy age 12 – 22, his first name, and a list of his likes and dislikes.

Gameplay began with a group of participants opening a pack of cards. One individual within the group would decide which of the boys in the pack they liked best, and write this down along with their reasons why. Then the other members of the group would write down which boy they thought would be good for this same individual, and why. The group would then take turns explaining their choices and reasoning. Players who guessed correctly earned a point. Play continued until everyone had a chance to select a boy, and the player with the most points won.

The game includes boys from across the United States, from different ethnic backgrounds and hair and eye colors, including disabled boys.

[The game was so popular that Decipher launched a companion "Boy Crazy" magazine in September 2001.

References

External links
An article on the game on RK Puma
Article on Jewish World Review

Decipher, Inc. games